Mbombela, also known as Nelspruit, is a city in northeastern South Africa. It is the capital of the Mpumalanga province. The city was one of the host cities of the 2010 FIFA World Cup.

History 
San rock art and Iron Age archaeological evidence indicate the area has a long history of human habitation. Construction for the Mpumalanga legislature revealed farming settlements, storage pits, burial sites, and pottery ranging from the 6th to 17th century. The presence of cattle bones at the Riverside site is thought to be evidence that early Nguni practices of labola originated in eastern South Africa.

The city was founded in 1895 by three brothers of the Nel family who grazed their cattle around the site in the winter months. During the Boer War, Nelspruit served briefly as the seat of government for the South African Republic, an independent Boer republic (not to be confused with the Republic of South Africa).

The settlement was a key stopover for the Eastern Railway built by the Netherlands-South African Railway Company in the late 19th century which ran from the newly discovered Witwatersrand goldfields to Delagoa Bay in Portuguese East Africa (modern-day Maputo, Mozambique). The discovery of gold in Mpumalanga, such as at Pilgrim's Rest and Barberton, encouraged further development.

The history of Nelspruit occurred along segregated lines. Under Apartheid’s policy of separate development, Black people were forcibly removed from the town to Lekazi, Kanyamazane, and other outlying areas as menial labour reserve. In the early 1970s, Nelpark was formed as a Coloured district and Valencia as an Indian area in the town. Youth centres, public amenities, and schools such as Nelspruit Laerskool were reserved for the town’s white population.

Name change 
In October 2009, the South African government renamed the city "Mbombela", the name of the local municipality. The Kruger Lowveld Chamber of Business and Tourism subsequently approached the High Court of South Africa to challenge the decision, citing a lack of both consultation and city funds available to pay for roadsign and website name changes. Ultimately, the name change was upheld in May 2014 by the North Gauteng High Court. Mbombela means "many people together in a small space" in Siswati.

Education and research institutions 
The city has four major public high schools and a TVET college (Ehlanzeni); more schools across all age groups are being built in response to overcrowding.

The city hosts the University of Mpumalanga (UMP). Established in 2014 with an intake of 140 students, it had over 4,300 students as of 2020. The Tshwane University of Technology has a satellite campus in the city with over 1,500 students, and UNISA has an office offering online courses.

The city is home to the Agricultural Research Council's Institute for Tropical and Subtropical Crops and the Lowveld National Botanical Garden. Citrus Research International (CRI) has a major facility in the city. The Lowveld College of Agriculture, located near UMP, also conducts research in the field of botany.

Transport

Road

The city is on the Maputo Corridor, a major trade route linking Pretoria to Maputo in Mozambique which, with the Trans-Kalahari Corridor, forms a transport trunk that crosses the entire sub-continent from Walvis Bay in Namibia on the Atlantic Ocean to Maputo on the Indian Ocean. The N4 toll route is the main arterial route with a double lane highway all the way to Johannesburg and Pretoria.

The new Northern Bypass was built for the N4 toll route, so the old road through the city centre (Samora Machel Drive) is now designated as the R104 route. Other roads in the area include the R40 route (which connects to Barberton, a border with Eswatini in the south and with White River in the north) and the R37 route (which connects to Lydenburg in the north-west).

Rail
Nelspruit railway station lies on the Pretoria–Maputo railway.

Air

Scheduled flights operate to locations within South Africa and abroad (to Zambia, Zimbabwe and Mozambique). The  complex has a  runway which can accommodate aircraft up to the size of a Boeing 747. The airport currently handles about 250,000 passengers per annum.

It primarily handles general aviation aircraft, and several aircraft maintenance, firefighting, charter and training companies are based at the airport.

Suburbs and townships

West Acres
Steiltes
Sonheuwel
Riverside
Alkmaar
Nelsville
Valencia Park
Nelindia
Stonehenge
Kamagugu
Vintonia
The Rest
Nelspruit Central (CBD)
Pumlanga
KaNyamazane
Pienaar
Schagen
KaBokweni
Matsulu 
Karino
Masoyi
KaMsogwaba

Tourism 
The city is a major stopover point for tourists travelling to Kruger National Park and to Mozambique. Other tourism attractions nearby include Sudwala Caves, and God's Window in the Blyde River Canyon Nature Reserve, a lookout point which provides a panoramic view over the famous Drakensberg Escarpment. The city is the nearest major South African city to Mozambique's capital, Maputo, and as such the city receives significant tourism from Mozambican locals. The city is also home to the National Botanical Gardens, set in 154 hectares of land along the eastern bank of the Crocodile River and containing around 500 species of plant species indigenous to the area.

Sport

Alkmaar Raceway
The Alkmaar Raceway is a motocross track. It hosted the 2008 FIM Motocross World Championship South African Motocross Grand Prix.

Mbombela Stadium 

Mbombela Stadium was built as an association football and rugby union stadium for the 2010 FIFA World Cup. Finished in November 2009 and costing , it has a capacity of 43,500; and the construction process contained several controversies. The stadium hosted four 2010 FIFA World Cup matches and is the current home of the Pumas rugby team.

In 2013 it hosted two rugby test matches between Italy and Samoa, followed by South Africa and Scotland. The Stadium hosts regular Premier Soccer League matches with Bidvest Wits, Kaizer Chiefs, Orlando Pirates and Mpumalanga Black Aces regularly playing host.

Mbombela Golf Club
Mbombela Golf Club was originally the Nelspruit Golf Club until 2017. Following an incident in which a black caddie was allegedly assaulted by four white golfers, the club's name was changed, alongside other commitments to increase the number of black staff and pay caddies a basic salary.

Media

Print
Lowveld Media is a major printer and publisher of newsprint materials in the region. Major newspapers include the Lowvelder, Mpumalanga News and Nelspruit Post. African Eye News Service is an established news agency in the city which writes articles for national newspapers and websites.

Broadcasting
The SABC has a regional office in the city. Jacaranda FM operates a studio near the Emnotweni Casino.

Ligwalagwala FM is the largest SABC-owned radio station in the city and the Mpumalanga Province. It is a public broadcaster which primarily broadcasts in the Swazi language.

RISE FM (originally named MPowerFM before it was bought out by the Times Media Group) is an independent commercial radio station broadcasting in English from studios in the city and eMalahleni to the province of Mpumalanga, and the Afrikaans local community radio station Radio Laeveld 100.5fm broadcasts to the Lowveld area from the city.

Culture

The city contains several entertainment venues, the most prominent being the Emnotweni Casino complex. The city has a civic centre (built in 1994) with a large theatre, which can be hired by both amateurs and professionals, but recently the centre has fallen into disrepair.

Mbombela has its own version of concert in the park with annual performances by musicians in the Lowveld National Botanical Gardens.

Several cultural and agricultural shows are hosted annually, including:
 The Lowveld Show
 The Lowveld Agri Show
 
 The Nelspruit Motor Show
 The Colour Run

Economy

The international grilled-chicken fast food restaurant chain Galito's was founded and is headquartered in the city.

Finance
The city is the financial and banking capital of Mpumalanga.

Retail
The city has a strong consumer-based retail industry boosted significantly by neighbouring Mozambican and Swazi tourists. There are various major shopping centers, notably the Riverside and Ilanga malls. Recent developments include the Crossing Shopping Center and the City Center.

Industry

The city is home to the Manganese Metal Company (MMC) and Delta EMD, which together form one of the largest manganese processing facilities in the world. There are several medium industries which support the agriculture and forestry sectors. There is also a thriving construction industry which, despite the 2008 recession, has kept growing.

Agriculture

The city is a key agricultural processing hub for northeastern South Africa. The macadamia industry is centred within the city, with an annual production for the 2017/18 production year of 26,400 tons NIS (nut-in shell at 1.5% kernel moisture content).  There are many citrus farms and the canning, juicing and extract of citrus fruit and other produce is a large business for the area. Fertile soils and the subtropical climate provide perfect conditions for the growing of citrus and tropical fruits, mainly mango, banana, avocado, papaya and macadamia nuts.

Sugar is also big business in the region. TSB, the producer of Selati sugar, is located a few kilometres east of the city. The low-lying areas in the region is dotted with sugarcane farms.

Forestry
The economy is heavily reliant on the forestry sector. SAPPI has a paper mill west of the city which was recently upgraded to produce cellulose fibers for various applications. The city is the global headquarters of KISHUGU which is the parent company of Working on Fire. KISHUGU is also a major player in the forestry sector. The region has several timber-related industries such as lumber and saw mills as well as furniture, crate and carton manufacturing businesses.

International relations
The city is twinned with:
 Maia, Portugal

Mozambique has a consulate in the city.

Climate
The city features a humid subtropical climate (Köppen Cwa) with mild winters and hot summers. Summers are hot and somewhat humid complete with high precipitation. Winters in the city are dry, with relatively warm temperatures during the day and chilly temperatures at night.

People
 Beth Diane Armstrong, sculptor
 Matthew Clay, swimmer, gold medallist in the 50m backstroke at the 2006 Commonwealth Games (representing England)
 Faf de Klerk, Springbok rugby player
 Cliff Drysdale, professional tennis player and television presenter
 Robert Gumede, businessman
 Anton Haig, professional golfer
 Janneman Malan, Proteas cricket team player
 Pieter Malan, South Africa national cricket team player
 Rebecca Malope, gospel music personality
 Mandisa Mashego, member of the Gauteng Provincial Legislature
 Heyneke Meyer, Springbok rugby coach
 Nicholas Nkuna, actor
 Ray Phiri, musician
 Monique Smit, professional golfer
 Renske Stoltz, South Africa national netball team player
 Lucas Thwala, South Africa national football team player
 Duane Vermeulen, Springbok rugby player
 Pedrie Wannenburg, Springbok rugby player
 Costa Titch, Hip Hop personality

References

External links
 Mbombela Local Municipality
 
 Ehlanzeni District Municipality
 Pacific Trail MFG

 
Populated places established in 1905
Populated places in the Mbombela Local Municipality
Provincial capitals in South Africa
Mbombela
1905 establishments in South Africa